Combinatorial optimization is a subfield of mathematical optimization   that consists of finding an optimal object from a finite set of objects, where the set of feasible solutions is discrete or can be reduced to a discrete set. Typical combinatorial optimization problems are the travelling salesman problem ("TSP"), the minimum spanning tree problem ("MST"), and the knapsack problem. In many such problems, such as the ones previously mentioned, exhaustive search is not tractable, and so specialized algorithms that quickly rule out large parts of the search space or approximation algorithms must be resorted to instead.

Combinatorial optimization is related to operations research, algorithm theory, and computational complexity theory. It has important applications in several fields, including artificial intelligence, machine learning, auction theory, software engineering, VLSI, applied mathematics and theoretical computer science.

Some research literature considers discrete optimization to consist of integer programming together with combinatorial optimization (which in turn is composed of optimization problems dealing with graph structures), although all of these topics have closely intertwined research literature. It often involves determining the way to efficiently allocate resources used to find solutions to mathematical problems.

Applications
Applications of combinatorial optimization include, but are not limited to:

 Logistics
 Supply chain optimization
 Developing the best airline network of spokes and destinations
 Deciding which taxis in a fleet to route to pick up fares
 Determining the optimal way to deliver packages
 Allocating jobs to people optimally
 Designing water distribution networks
 Earth science problems (e.g. reservoir flow-rates)

Methods
There is a large amount of literature on polynomial-time algorithms for certain special classes of discrete optimization. A considerable amount of it is unified by the theory of linear programming. Some examples of combinatorial optimization problems that are covered by this framework are shortest paths and shortest-path trees, flows and circulations, spanning trees, matching, and matroid problems.

For NP-complete discrete optimization problems, current research literature includes the following topics:
 polynomial-time exactly solvable special cases of the problem at hand (e.g. fixed-parameter tractable problems)
 algorithms that perform well on "random" instances (e.g. for the traveling salesman problem)
 approximation algorithms that run in polynomial time and find a solution that is close to optimal
 parameterized approximation algorithms that run in FPT time and find a solution close to the optimum
 solving real-world instances that arise in practice and do not necessarily exhibit the worst-case behavior of in NP-complete problems (e.g. real-world TSP instances with tens of thousands of nodes).

Combinatorial optimization problems can be viewed as searching for the best element of some set of discrete items; therefore, in principle, any sort of search algorithm or metaheuristic can be used to solve them. Perhaps the most universally applicable approaches are branch-and-bound (an exact algorithm which can be stopped at any point in time to serve as heuristic), branch-and-cut (uses linear optimisation to generate bounds), dynamic programming (a recursive solution construction with limited search window) and tabu search (a greedy-type swapping algorithm). However, generic search algorithms are not guaranteed to find an optimal solution first, nor are they guaranteed to run quickly (in polynomial time). Since some discrete optimization problems are NP-complete, such as the traveling salesman (decision) problem, this is expected unless P=NP.

Formal definition 
Formally, a combinatorial optimization problem  is a quadruple , where

  is a set of instances;
 given an instance ,  is the finite set of feasible solutions;

The goal is then to find for some instance  an optimal solution, that is, a feasible solution  with

 

For each combinatorial optimization problem, there is a corresponding decision problem that asks whether there is a feasible solution for some particular measure . This problem might have an answer of, say, 4. This problem can be answered with a simple 'yes' or 'no'.

The field of approximation algorithms deals with algorithms to find near-optimal solutions to hard problems. The usual decision version is then an inadequate definition of the problem since it only specifies acceptable solutions. Even though we could introduce suitable decision problems, the problem is then more naturally characterized as an optimization problem.

NP optimization problem 

An NP-optimization problem (NPO) is a combinatorial optimization problem with the following additional conditions. Note that the below referred polynomials are functions of the size of the respective functions' inputs, not the size of some implicit set of input instances.

 the size of every feasible solution  is polynomially bounded in the size of the given instance ,
 the languages  and  can be recognized in polynomial time, and
  is polynomial-time computable.

This implies that the corresponding decision problem is in NP. In computer science, interesting optimization problems usually have the above properties and are therefore NPO problems. A problem is additionally called a P-optimization (PO) problem, if there exists an algorithm which finds optimal solutions in polynomial time. Often, when dealing with the class NPO, one is interested in optimization problems for which the decision versions are NP-complete. Note that hardness relations are always with respect to some reduction. Due to the connection between approximation algorithms and computational optimization problems, reductions which preserve approximation in some respect are for this subject preferred than the usual Turing and Karp reductions. An example of such a reduction would be L-reduction. For this reason, optimization problems with NP-complete decision versions are not necessarily called NPO-complete.

NPO is divided into the following subclasses according to their approximability:

 NPO(I): Equals FPTAS. Contains the Knapsack problem.
 NPO(II): Equals PTAS. Contains the Makespan scheduling problem.
 NPO(III): :The class of NPO problems that have polynomial-time algorithms which computes solutions with a cost at most c times the optimal cost (for minimization problems) or a cost at least  of the optimal cost (for maximization problems). In Hromkovič's book, excluded from this class are all NPO(II)-problems save if P=NP. Without the exclusion, equals APX. Contains MAX-SAT and metric TSP.
 NPO(IV): :The class of NPO problems with polynomial-time algorithms approximating the optimal solution by a ratio that is polynomial in a logarithm of the size of the input. In Hromkovič's book, all NPO(III)-problems are excluded from this class unless P=NP. Contains the set cover problem.
 NPO(V): :The class of NPO problems with polynomial-time algorithms approximating the optimal solution by a ratio bounded by some function on n. In Hromkovic's book, all NPO(IV)-problems  are excluded from this class unless P=NP. Contains the TSP and clique problem.

The class NPOPB is the class of NPO problems that are polynomially-bounded.

Specific problems

 Assignment problem
 Closure problem
 Constraint satisfaction problem
 Cutting stock problem
 Dominating set problem
 Integer programming
 Knapsack problem
 Minimum relevant variables in linear system
 Minimum spanning tree
 Nurse scheduling problem
 Set cover problem
 Job shop scheduling
 Traveling salesman problem
 Vehicle rescheduling problem
 Vehicle routing problem
 Weapon target assignment problem
 Bin packing problem
 Talent Scheduling

See also
Constraint composite graph

Notes

References

 (Information on the largest TSP instances solved to date.)

 (This is a continuously updated catalog of approximability results for NP optimization problems.)

External links

Journal of Combinatorial Optimization
The Aussois Combinatorial Optimization Workshop
Java Combinatorial Optimization Platform (open source code)
Why is scheduling people hard?
Complexity classes for optimization problems / Stefan Kugele

 
Computational complexity theory
Theoretical computer science

eo:Diskreta optimumigo